The thirteenth season of Degrassi, a Canadian serial teen drama television series, premiered on July 11, 2013, concluded on July 29, 2014 in Canada and the United States, and consists of 40 episodes. Although only four school years have passed in the story timeline since season six, this season was split into 3 parts. The first part is set in the summer. The second part is set in the fall/winter semester. The third and final part is set during the first term of the Spring semester.  Writers have been able to use a semi-floating timeline, so that the issues depicted are modern for their viewers. This season depicts the lives of a group of high school Freshmen, sophomores, seniors and graduates as they deal with some of the challenges and issues that teenagers face such as cancer, texting while driving, death, sexism, sleep disorders, cyber bullying, domestic violence, rape, racial profiling and relationships.

The thirteenth season was announced November 30, 2012, and production for the season began in April 2013 at Epitome Pictures' studios in Toronto, Ontario. This season departs from the telenovela/soap opera format used in the previous three seasons. This also marks the first time in Degrassi history that a season aired for a full year as the season began airing in early July 2013 and ended in late July 2014  and was split into 3 parts.

Initially broadcast in Canada on MuchMusic, the show moved to sibling channel MTV Canada on October 3, 2013.

Cast
The thirteenth season has 26 actors receiving star billing with 20 of them returning from the previous season. Starting this season, cast members are only credited for the episodes they appear in. Returning cast members include: 

 Craig Arnold as Luke Baker (8 episodes)
 Luke Bilyk as Drew Torres (38 episodes)
 Stefan Brogren as Archie "Snake" Simpson (12 episodes)
 Munro Chambers as Eli Goldsworthy (13 episodes)
 Sarah Fisher as Becky Baker (25 episodes)
 Jahmil French as Dave Turner (1 episode)
 Ricardo Hoyos as Zigmund "Zig" Novak (18 episodes)
 Alicia Josipovic as Bianca DeSousa (4 episodes)
 Demetrius Joyette as Mike "Dallas" Dallas (32 episodes)
 Cory Lee as Miss Oh (3 episodes)
 Lyle Lettau as Tristan Milligan (33 episodes)
 Aislinn Paul as Clare Edwards (36 episodes)
 Cristine Prosperi as Imogen Moreno (30 episodes)
 Chloe Rose as Katie Matlin (2 episodes)
 A.J. Saudin as Connor DeLaurier (24 episodes)
 Olivia Scriven as Maya Matlin (38 episodes)
 Melinda Shankar as Alli Bhandari (33 episodes)
 Jordan Todosey as Adam Torres (8 episodes)
 Jessica Tyler as Jenna Middleton (25 episodes)

Joining the main cast this season are: 

 Ana Golja as Zoë Rivas (34 episodes)
 Nikki Gould as Grace Cardinal (15 episodes)
 André Kim as Winston "Chewy" Chu (27 episodes)
 Eric Osborne as Miles Hollingsworth III (34 episodes)
 Sara Waisglass as Francesca "Frankie" Hollingsworth (19 episodes)
 Niamh Wilson as Jacqueline "Jack" Jones (10 episodes)

The six actors from season twelve who did not return this season were:

Shanice Banton as Marisol Lewis
Annie Clark as Fiona Coyne
Daniel Kelly as Owen Milligan
Justin Kelly as Jake Martin
Jacob Neayem as Mohammed "Mo" Mashkour
Alexa Steele as Tori Santamaria

All left the series.

Crew
Season thirteen is produced by Epitome Pictures in association with Bell Media. Funding was provided by The Canadian Media Fund, The Shaw Rocket Fund, RBC Royal Bank, The Canadian Film or Video Production Tax Credit, and the Ontario Film and Television Tax Credit.

Linda Schuyler, co-creator of the Degrassi franchise and CEO of Epitome Pictures, serves as an executive producer with her husband, and President of Epitome Pictures, Stephen Stohn. Matt Huether is also credited as a co-executive producer, Karen Hill as consulting producer, Sarah Glinski an executive producer, and Ella Schwarzman an executive post producer. Stefan Brogren is series producer, while David Lowe is credited as producer, and Stephanie Williams the supervising producer. The casting directors are Larissa Mair and Krisha Bullock Alexander, and the editors include Jason B. Irvine and Gordon Thorne.

The executive story editor is Matt Schiller, the story editors are Ian Malone and Sadiya Durrani, and Courtney Jane Walker is the senior story editor. Episode writers for the season include Ramona Barckert, Karen Hill, Michael Grassi, and Matt Schiller. The director of photography is Mitchell T. Ness, and the directors include Stefan Brogren and Bruce McDonald.

Episodes
The summer block began with a one-hour special, and aired weekly with an after show, After Degrassi.  The fall block ran from October 3 to November 21, 2013, on MTV in Canada, and on TeenNick in the United States. The winter block began on January 28, continued through spring, and ended on April 22, 2014 on MTV in Canada, and TeenNick in the United States. Unlike previous seasons, the thirteenth season continued through until summer and has a second summer block, which began on June 3, 2014 on MTV in Canada, and TeenNick in the United States, making this season the first to have new episodes from the same season airing a year after the first episode premiered.

Controversy
With many questions regarding the lack of a DVD release, executive producer Stephen Stohn posted on Twitter and Facebook:

The decision to kill off Adam Torres, the only transgender character in the show's history, during this season garnered fan backlash. In a statement, LGBT media watchdogs GLAAD said:When Degrassi introduced its large and loyal audience to Adam Torres, an authentic, multi-dimensional transgender character, the show not only made television history, but set a new standard industry standard for LGBT inclusion. With so few transgender characters on television, we are disappointed that Adam’s story had to end this way, and we hope other shows will follow Degrassi’s lead in bringing stories like his to viewers...Linda Schuyler, one of the show's creators, defended the choice to kill the character, saying in a statement:The combination of Adam being a favorite character, and Jordan being at the end of her contract, presented a unique opportunity to tell this story through such a beloved character. As saddened as we are to say goodbye to Adam, we feel this storyline will affect even more lives in an authentic way...

References

External links
 List of Degrassi: The Next Generation episodes at IMDB.

Degrassi: The Next Generation seasons
2013 Canadian television seasons
2014 Canadian television seasons